Jewels of Darkness is a trilogy of text adventure games by Level 9. The individual games were initially released separately in 1982. They featured some themes and names inspired by the books of J. R. R. Tolkien and so became known as the Middle-Earth Trilogy. The individual releases were available for the BBC Micro unlike the compilation.

In 1986 the three games were revised, expanded and rereleased together as a compilation. For legal reasons the references to Middle Earth were removed and the trilogy was retitled Jewels of Darkness. The games include simple static graphics.

The games

Colossal Adventure

An expanded version of the original Adventure by Will Crowther and Don Woods

Adventure Quest
Similar in structure to the previous game, the player must defeat the Dark Lord, Agaliarept.

Dungeon Adventure
A continuation of the previous game; following the defeat of the Dark Lord, Agaliarept, the player must explore his dungeon looking for treasure.

Reception

Computer Gaming World stated that the compilation's claim that the games had been "significantly revised to incorporate the latest innovative techniques" was false. It described the puzzles as illogical, the Commodore version's graphics as "crude", and, like the parser, below the standard of previous Firebird text adventures.

"[The graphics are] colourful but they're not great works of art. And the location descriptions and scenarios have always struck me as being good enough on their own."
Zzap! issue sept. 1986

References

External links 

Jewels of Darkness on the Amiga at the Hall of Light
Jewels of Darkness at Lemon 64
Jewels of Darkness at Lemon Amiga
Jewels of Darkness at The Level 9 Memorial
Jewels of Darkness at The Bird Sanctuary
Images of Commodore 64 version of Colossal Adventure box and manual at C64Sets.com

1983 video games
1986 video games
1980s interactive fiction
Amiga games
Amstrad CPC games
Amstrad PCW games
Atari 8-bit family games
Atari ST games
BBC Micro and Acorn Electron games
Classic Mac OS games
Commodore 64 games
DOS games
Level 9 Computing games
MSX games
Telecomsoft games
Trilogies
Video game compilations
Video game franchises introduced in 1983
Video games based on Middle-earth
Video games developed in the United Kingdom
ZX Spectrum games